Viscount Léon de Poncins (3 November 1897 – 18 December 1975) was a French aristocrat and a traditional Catholic journalist and essayist. He authored numerous books and articles advancing a Judeo-Masonic conspiracy theory.

Léon de Poncins' explanation for most of the major revolutionary political upheavals of modernity was the influence of certain secret societies with an anti-Christian agenda — as well as a "occult war" waged by those possessing a diabolical kind of "faith".

Biography
Born Gabriel Léon Marie Pierre de Montaigne de Poncins in Civens, Loire. He was descended of an aristocratic family ennobled in 1696.

His writings enjoyed some prominence in the 1930s (many of his works were translated into English, Italian, German, and Spanish). Léon de Poncins contributed to many newspapers like Le Jour, Le Figaro, L'Ami du peuple, and Le Nouvelliste; he also directed the journal Contre-Révolution (Counter-Revolution) from 1937 to 1939.

Léon de Poncins was a devout Catholic and counter-revolutionary. His writings show anti-Jewish, anti-Communist, anti-Masonic, and anti-progressive views. Until his death, in Toulon, he denounced the occult forces and organizations that ruled the world and sought to poison Christianity.

Views

Influence of secret societies
In his writings, he denounced Masonic conspiracies (pointing out the relationship between Freemasonry and the French Revolution, the League of Nations, etc.), and the Jewish influence in Catholic affairs.

His work was seen as a continuation of the Revue Internationale des Sociétés Secrètes (International Review of Secret Societies), whose primary editor was Mgr. Ernest Jouin (1844–1932).

Léon de Poncins was a friend of Emmanuel Malynski (died 1938)— with whom he wrote La Guerre occulte (The Occult War)— and Jean Vaquié (1911–1992), with whom he wrote in the journals Lectures françaises and Lecture et Tradition, and for the Chiré-en-Montreuil-based publishing house Éditions de Chiré. Léon de Poncins wrote the preface to Vaquié's La Révolution Liturgique ([The Liturgical Revolution]).

Julius Evola translated La Guerre occulte into Italian.

In a 1949 letter from René Guenon to Evola, he expresses a belief that Léon de Poncins was subjected to attacks from "a group of dangerous sorcerers" who were connected to his secretary, Eve Louguet.

On World War I
In his historical analysis of the First World War, Léon de Poncins suggests that concerted lobbying by international Zionist circles led to the creation of the future Jewish state in Palestine by means of manipulating alliances and oppositions between countries. In 1916— at a time when Germany triumphed on all fronts and the British planned to sign an armistice then advanced by the Kaiser— Zionists secured a promise of Palestine (then under the domination of the Ottoman Empire) as a Jewish settlement  from the government of Britain in exchange for the United States' entry into the war alongside the Triple Entente. To corroborate his thesis, Léon de Poncins cited Great Britain, The Jews and Palestine, a 1936 book by pro-Zionist author, Samuel Landman.

On Vatican II
During the Second Vatican Council, following the vote on 20 November 1964, at the third session of the provisional scheme dealing with the Church's attitude towards Judaism, Léon de Poncins wrote a pamphlet, Le Problème juif face au Concile (The Jewish Question Facing the Council), which was distributed to the bishops before the fourth and final session. The author noted "by the Council Fathers a profound misunderstanding of what constitutes the essence of Judaism." Léon de Poncins' advice had a significant effect on the drafting of Nostra aetate, adopted on 28 October 1965.

Works

References

1897 births
1975 deaths
People from Loire (department)
French male non-fiction writers
French Roman Catholics
Roman Catholic writers
 French traditionalist Catholics
Traditionalist Catholic conspiracy theorists
French conspiracy theorists
French political writers
Writers from Auvergne-Rhône-Alpes
Far-right politics in France
Anti-Masonry
French anti-communists
Antisemitism in France
Late modern Christian antisemitism
20th-century French essayists
20th-century French journalists
20th-century French male writers